The 2019–20 Punjab F.C. Season was the club's Sixth season in the I-League.

Current squad

Transfers

In

Out

Team management

Competitions

I-League

League table

See also
 2021–22 in Indian football
 2021–22 I-League

References

Minerva Punjab F.C.
RoundGlass Punjab FC seasons